Tamika Renee Montgomery-Reeves (born April 29, 1981) is an American lawyer who serves as a United States circuit judge of the United States Court of Appeals for the Third Circuit. She previously served as a justice of the Delaware Supreme Court.

Early life and education 
Montgomery was born in Jackson, Mississippi, to Dewrey and Bettye (nee Cribbs) Montgomery. She received a Bachelor of Arts, magna cum laude, from the University of Mississippi in 2003 and a Juris Doctor from the University of Georgia School of Law in 2006.

Career 

Montgomery-Reeves practiced at Wilson Sonsini Goodrich & Rosati in Wilmington where she focused on corporate governance and commercial litigation. She also practiced at Weil Gotshal & Manges in New York City, where she focused on corporate governance and securities litigation. Montgomery-Reeves was appointed vice chancellor the Delaware Court of Chancery in 2015 and has worked pro bono with the Prisoners' Rights Project. Montgomery-Reeves joined Chief Justice Collins J. Seitz Jr. on the steering committee of a group that completed a strategic plan for increasing diversity in Delaware's judiciary and legal community.

Delaware judicial service 
On October 13, 2015, Governor Jack Markell nominated Montgomery-Reeves to the Delaware Court of Chancery to succeed Vice Chancellor Donald F. Parsons

On October 24, 2019, Governor John Carney announced the nomination of Montgomery-Reeves to be a justice of the Delaware Supreme Court, to fill the vacancy left by the elevation of Collins J. Seitz Jr. to chief justice. On November 7, 2019, her nomination was confirmed by the Delaware Senate. She is the first African-American justice on that court. She was sworn into office on January 3, 2020.  In 2021, Montgomery-Reeves wrote the majority opinion holding that Senate records submitted to the University of Delaware archives by President Biden were not subject to demands under the Delaware Freedom of Information Act. Her service as a justice of the Delaware Supreme Court ended on February 7, 2023, when she was elevated to the United States Court of Appeals for the Third Circuit.

Federal judicial service 

On June 29, 2022, President Joe Biden announced his intent to nominate Montgomery-Reeves to serve as a United States circuit judge of the United States Court of Appeals for the Third Circuit. On July 11, 2022, her nomination was sent to the Senate. President Biden nominated Montgomery-Reeves to the seat vacated by Judge Thomas L. Ambro, who will assume senior status upon confirmation of a successor. On September 7, 2022, a hearing on her nomination was held before the Senate Judiciary Committee.  Montgomery-Reeves was unanimously rated "well qualified" for the judgeship by the American Bar Association's Standing Committee on the Federal Judiciary. 

During her confirmation hearing, Republican senators questioned Montgomery-Reeves about a strategic plan to increase diversity in Delaware's judiciary. The plan was based on recommendations made by the Delaware Supreme Court's Diversity Strategic Planning Steering Committee, which Montgomery-Reeves had co-chaired. She was asked about a recommendation that prospective lawyers be able to use clerkships and recommendations in lieu of passing the bar exam, which the committee said was a barrier to minority people. The committee also recommended that portraits of white judges and justices be removed from courthouses as a way to "reduce implicit bias and identity threat in the court environment." Montgomery-Reeves distanced herself from these recommendations by saying that she had neither written nor edited any of them despite being committee co-chair. On September 28, 2022, her nomination was reported out of committee by a 13–9 vote. On December 8, 2022, the United States Senate invoked cloture on her nomination by a 57–39 vote. On December 12, 2022, her nomination was confirmed by a 53–35 vote. She received her judicial commission on February 7, 2023.

See also 
 Joe Biden Supreme Court candidates
 List of African-American federal judges
 List of African-American jurists

References

External links 
 
 
 Montgomery-Reeves Sworn In As Justice Of The Delaware Supreme Court
 Law notes: Supreme Court, Potter Anderson, Cohen Seglias, Burns White
 First Black justice takes seat on Delaware's Supreme Court

1981 births
Living people
20th-century African-American people
20th-century African-American women
21st-century African-American people
21st-century African-American women
21st-century American judges
21st-century American lawyers
21st-century American women lawyers
21st-century American women judges
African-American judges
African-American lawyers
African-American women lawyers
Delaware Democrats
Delaware lawyers
Judges of the United States Court of Appeals for the Third Circuit
Justices of the Delaware Supreme Court
People from Jackson, Mississippi
United States court of appeals judges appointed by Joe Biden
University of Georgia School of Law alumni
University of Mississippi alumni
Vice Chancellors of Delaware